The Archdiocese of Trivandrum  is a Latin Church ecclesiastical territory or archdiocese of the Catholic Church. Its episcopal see is Thiruvananthapuram in Kerala, India. It shares its see with the major archeparchy of the Syro-Malankara Catholic Church, the Major Archeparchy of Trivandrum. The archdiocese a metropolitan see of an ecclesiastical province with four suffragan dioceses.

Population and area 
The Archdiocese of Trivandrum (Thiruvananthapuram) is one of the biggest episcopal territories in Kerala, with a Catholic population of nearly 280,000 people, even after the bifurcation of the Diocese of Neyyattinkara some years ago. The 95 parishes, 31 quasi parishes and 34 mass centers of the Diocese are grouped together into 9 Foranes. At present there are 164 incardinated priests in the Archdiocese including those retired, studying and working for other Dioceses, and 161 religious priests.

Topography 
The archdiocese is headquartered in Kerala's capital city Thiruvananthapuram, formerly known as Trivandrum. The archdiocese is bounded by the Arabian Sea on the West and Western Ghat on the East. There are wooded highlands on the Western Ghats in the eastern and northeastern borders, and a long shoreline with internationally renowned beaches, historic monuments, backwater stretches and a rich cultural heritage.

The diocese is bounded on the north by the Diocese of Quilon, on the east by the Ghats, on the west by the Arabian Sea and on the south by the Diocese of Kottar.

History

Early history 
With the arrival of the Portuguese but especially with the advent of the pioneer missionary Francis Xavier, Latin Catholicism spread far and wide in these parts; by the close of the sixteenth century there were well-established Christian communities along the Trivandrum coast. But with the suppression of the Society of Jesus, this missionary enterprises came to a close.

The second phase of the missionary enterprise in the Diocese begins with the dawn of the twentieth century. Bishop Benziger, who became coadjutor Bishop of Quilon in 1900 and Bishop in 1905,  propagated Christianity in the Diocese with the help of missionary priests. In 1931, when he retired to the Carmel Hill Monastery, Trivandrum, there were Christian communities established in almost all places of the interior region. As early as 1919, Bishop Benziger recommended the establishment of the Diocese of Trivandrum, but it materialized only after his retirement.

Erection of the diocese and first bishops 
On 1 July 1937, by the Bull "In Ora Malabarica" Pope Pius XI created the Diocese of Trivandrum with the four taluks of Neyyantinkara, Nedumangad, Trivandrum and Chirayinkeezh bifurcated from the diocese of Quilon. Bishop Vincent V Dereere, OCD., Bishop of Quilon was transferred to the newly erected Diocese of Trivandrum which was entrusted to the Carmelites of the Flanders Province (Belgium).

In 1952, when the Diocese of Alleppey was erected by the bifurcation of the formerly Padroado Diocese of Cochin, the stripe of coastal parishes which formed the Trivandrum Portuguese Mission was temporarily annexed to the Diocese of Trivandrum with Bishop Vincent V. Dereere as its administrator. On 20 May 1955, this territory was definitely integrated in the Diocese of Trivandrum.

On 24 October 1966, when Bishop Vincent V.Dereere OCD. resigned from the See of Trivandrum, Bishop Peter Bernard Pereira was the first Indian to be appointed Bishop of Trivandrum, and the Diocese passed into the hands of the indigenous clergy. The Liturgical and Catechetical renewal initiated by Bishop Bernard Pereira after the II Vatican Council marks the beginning of renewal in the Diocese. St.Xavier's College, Thumba, All Saint's College and various other pioneering contributions of Bp. Pereira made a strong footing for the growth of the Diocese of Trivandrum.

The Diocese celebrated its Golden Jubilee year in 1987, and a renewal movement was initiated by Bishop Jacob Acharuparambil.In 1512 Basic Christian Communities lay people come forward to share responsibilities. On 14 June 1996 the Diocese of Trivandrum lost territory to the newly erected Diocese of Neyyattinkara.

Bishop 

On 17 June 2004 Pope John Paul II elevated the Diocese of Trivandrum into an Archdiocese, and appointed Soosa Pakiam as its first Archbishop. On 2 February 2016, Pope Francis appointed Christudas Rajappan as the new auxiliary bishop of the diocese. Patroness of the Archdiocese is St. Theresa of Child Jesus.

Statistics

Leadership
 Archbishops of Thiruvananthapuram (Latin Rite)
 Archbishop Thomas J. Netto (19 March   2022 - Present)
 Archbishop Maria Kalist Soosa Pakiam (3 June 2004 – 18 March 2022)
 Bishops of Thiruvananthapuram (Latin Rite)
 Bishop Maria Kalist Soosa Pakiam (later Archbishop) (31 January 1991 – 3 June 2004)
 Bishop Benedict Jacob Acharuparambil, O.F.M. Cap. (3 August 1979 – 31 January 1991)
 Bishop Peter B. Pereira (1 October 1966 – 13 June 1978)
 Bishop Vincent Victor Dereere, O.C.D. (1 July 1937 – 24 October 1966)

Suffragan dioceses
 Alleppey
 Neyyattinkara
 Punalur
 Quilon

Current Leadership 
• Metropolitan Archbishop Emeritus  = Maria Kalist Soosa Pakiam

• Metropolitan Archbishop = Rev. Dr. Thomas. J. Netto

• Auxiliary Bishop = Rt. Rev. Dr. Christhudas R

Notes

Forane
 Anjengo Forane
 Kovalam Forane
 Palayam Forane
 Pettah Forane
 Pulluvila Forane
 Puthukurichy Forane
 Thoothoor Forane
 Valiyathura Forane
 Kazhakkutom Forane

External links

 

1937 establishments in India
Christian organizations established in 1937
Churches in Thiruvananthapuram district
Dioceses in Kerala
Roman Catholic dioceses and prelatures established in the 20th century
Roman Catholic dioceses in India